Kunnamthanam  is a village in Pathanamthitta district in Thiruvalla Revenue Division & Thiruvalla Constituency In the state of Kerala, India.
Kunnamthanam organized mass yoga practise with 5,000 people.
It is one of the nine villages that form Mallapally Taluk of Pathanamthitta district. 
The main junction at Kunnamthanam is a major T-junction, as it is situated almost midway between Mallappally and Thiruvalla, at the center of a quadrilateral with Changanacherry and Karukachal as the other two vertices. Famous Madthilkavu Bhagavathi temple and St. Mary's Sehion Orthodox Church (popularly known as Vallamala Church) are situated in Kunnamthanam. NSS High School is the oldest school in this village.

Demographics
 India census, Kunnamthanam had a population of 20157 with 9466 males and 10691 females. Well known as Yoga Village

Schools

 NSS HSS Kunnamthanam
 St.Marys LP School Palakkathakidi

Syrian Christian Settlements
The Syrian Christian colonization profoundly affected the historical backdrop of trade and agribusiness in these parts. The place is, hence, home to numerous Syrian Christian groups of Kerala who own large farms and bungalows, due to the creation of latex.The Christians guarantee their underlying foundations from early settlements from Mesopotamian merchants and East Syriac Christians from Venad. Kunnamthanam turned into a significant warehouse for flavours like pepper, cardamom, and so forth. Syro-Malankara and Syrian Orthodox Christians occupations consisted of landowners, farmers and merchants.

Festivals

Padayani
Kunnamthanam has three popular temples 1) Madathilkavil Bhagavathi Temple, 2)  Pulappukave Shiva Temple The latter is famous for its Padayani, an ancient festival that has been revived in recent years.

Tourist attractions
Madathilkavu Bhagavathy Temple is one of the famous temples in Pathanamtitta District situated in Kunnamthanam. This Temple is hallmark in Kunnamthanam.

St Joseph Catholic Church, Kunnamthanam, is located near the Kunnamthanam–Manthanam road.
The Little Servants of the Divine Providence is a convent begun here. The convent has a retreat center called Zion Retreat Center as well as a Providence Home that takes care of orphans and the elderly. The main attraction of Kunnamthanam grama Panchayat is, Kunnamthanam industrial development area (KINFRA)

References

External links
 Pathanamthitta District - official website

Villages in Pathanamthitta district